Karaağaç is a village in the İpsala District of Edirne Province in northwestern Turkey. Together with the village of Bosna, it is one of the two Turkish settlements in East Thrace, part of whose territory is situated on the right bank of the Meriç River, therefore within Western Thrace.

References

Geography of Edirne Province
Villages in İpsala District